VisitDenmark is the Official Tourism Organisation of Denmark.

The organisation is marketing Denmark as a tourist destination abroad, with a view to attracting more holiday visitors and conference delegates, who can generate increased revenue for the tourism industry.
The marketing activities are carried out in close cooperation with the tourism industry and other integral players, for example through partnerships.

VisitDenmark is headed by a board, appointed by the Danish Minister of Business and Growth.  The budget is 113 mio. kr. (€15 million.) 50/50 co-finansing from partners.

VisitDenmark’s headquarters is in Copenhagen. Market offices in Norway, Sweden, Germany, United Kingdom, the Netherlands, Italy, the United States and China.

Marketing 
Marketing is targeted to four target groups – because their destination  preferences  match Denmark’s strong destination selling points and because of their  large growth potential.

* Fun, Play and Learning
 Families with young  children who  travel  to child-friendly environments for  family time  close to  nature and  attractions.
* The Good Life
 Adults who prefer the quiet  life with relaxation, nature, good food, walking , culture and events.
* City breaks 
 People who like the  metropolis  atmosphere  and being  close to culture, sights, restaurants and  shopping  areas.
* Business tourism 
 International meeting organisers, who arrange large meetings, congresses and  conferences.

Facts about Danish tourism 
 Total bednights: 45 m.  
 Domestic bednights: 23 m.   
 Foreign bednights: 22 m. 
 Out of the  total bednights  is 15.7 m. cottage  bednights ( 12 m. foreign bednights) 
 Turnover: 82  bn. kr (€11 bn) 
 Export revenue : 35 bn. kr. ( approx. €5 bn)  (4% of the total ) 
 Jobs: 119.000 
 Tax  income generated: 28,1 bn. kr. ( approx. €5 bn.)

Links 

http://www.visitdenmark.com (in English)

http://www.visitdenmark.dk (in Danish)

References 

Tourism in Denmark
Tourism agencies